The 2016 census of Ireland was held on Sunday, 24 April 2016. It was organised by the Central Statistics Office (CSO) and reported a total population of 4,761,865, or a 3.8% increase since the prior 2011 census. This was the lowest recorded population growth rate since the 1991 census, with the decline in population growth rates attributed to both lower birth rates and lower net migration. The census results were released gradually between April and December 2017 in a series of reports organised either as summaries or in-depth results of specific themes, like age, ethnicity, or religion.

The following census took place in April 2022, having been delayed for one year due to the COVID-19 pandemic.

Background
Although Irish law does not prescribe a regular interval for administering censuses, Census 2016 was held in accordance with Irish government tradition since 1951 to administer a census on a Sunday in April on years ending with the numbers '1' or '6'. This incidentally coincided with the centenary of the 1916 Easter Rising, which began on Easter Monday, 24 April 1916.

Responsibility for organising the census fell with the Central Statistics Office, which operates within the Department of the Taoiseach. The CSO hired 4,660 enumerators, supported by 430 field supervisors, who reported in turn to 44 regional supervisors. In delivering over two million census forms, enumerators were required to make personal contact with a resident at the property.

Census form
Census 2016 was the first Irish census that allowed respondents to report a marital status contracted with a person of the same sex. This followed a 2015 referendum to amend the Irish Constitution to permit same-sex marriages, which was passed into law by the Marriage Act 2015. Other than marital status, the 2016 census form copied all questions verbatim from the 2011 census form. The same is not planned for the 2022 census, which underwent a public consultation process in 2017 to formulate new questions. These changes included a revision to questions on religion, which Atheist Ireland argued skewed responses towards religiosity. The new questions were trialed in West Cork in 2018.

Although most census forms in 2016 were collected in person by returning enumerators, over 15,000 forms were returned by post, with all recipients legally required to return completed forms.

Results
The census's results on declining religiosity, the aging population, and rising homelessness all drew attention in Irish media. Affiliation with the largest religion in Ireland, Roman Catholicism, dropped to 78%, down from 84% in 2011. The census also reported the first ever recorded fall in the absolute number of Roman Catholics. A thematic report on housing found that home ownership rates reached their lowest since 1971, which Minister for Housing, Planning, Community and Local Government Simon Coveney described as a "stark story" emanating from "fundamental structural problems", which he associated with the 2008 Recession and Irish housing bubble.

Population change
While Ireland's population continued to grow in the 2011–2016 period, the decline in growth rates was noted by multiple outlets and the CSO's reporting.

Province

Region and county
The local government area with the highest percentage growth rate was Fingal (8.1%), while Dublin city had the largest population increase (+26,942). Of Ireland's traditional counties, the largest overall population increase was in Dublin (+74,799), while both Dublin and Meath were jointly the fastest growing counties (5.9%). Three counties declined in population: Sligo (−0.1%), Mayo (−0.2%), and Donegal (−1.2%).

See also
 Demographics of the Republic of Ireland
 Irish population analysis

Notes

References 

2016 in the Republic of Ireland
2016 censuses
Censuses in the Republic of Ireland
Demographics of Ireland
Geographic history of Ireland